The Shaggy D.A. is a 1976 American comedy film and a sequel to The Shaggy Dog (1959) produced by Walt Disney Productions. It was directed by Robert Stevenson and written by Don Tait. As with the first film in the series, it takes some inspiration from the Felix Salten novel, The Hound of Florence.

It stars Dean Jones as the adult Wilby Daniels, Suzanne Pleshette, Tim Conway, Keenan Wynn, Dick Van Patten, Jo Anne Worley and Shane Sinutko. It was Stevenson's final film for Disney, and his final film overall.

Plot
Wilby Daniels is now a successful attorney who is married to Betty, and they have a son named Brian.  Returning to the town of Medfield from a vacation, the family discovers that they have been robbed of almost all their possessions, and Wilby blames the local district attorney John Slade, who is reputed to have connections with organized crime, particularly with warehouse owner Edward "Fast Eddie" Roshak. After being robbed a second time later that night (along with their Navy admiral neighbor, Gordon C. Brenner), Wilby vows to run for district attorney to make his town safe again.

Meanwhile, the two thugs who had robbed the Daniels', Freddie and Dip, observe the Borgia ring at the local museum and assume it might fetch a large sum, so they steal it. The ugly ring with a scarab on it can only be pawned off to local bumbling ice cream salesman, Tim, who is the owner of a large Old English Sheepdog named Elwood. Tim figures he will give the ring to his girlfriend Katrinka, a local roller derby star and pastry assistant.

While dressing himself in preparation for a live television broadcast to announce his candidacy, Wilby hears a report of the Borgia ring being stolen. He freezes in terror, then reveals his former shape-shifting secret to his wife, who is certain his story cannot be true; he warns her that if the inscription on the ring ("In canis corpore transmuto") [I transmute into the body of a dog] is spoken aloud he will turn into a shaggy dog. Soon afterward, Wilby is moments before his live television debut as Tim discovers the inscription on the ring and reads it aloud, causing Elwood to disappear – only to reappear moments later as he takes over Wilby's body. Moments before the cameras roll Brian notices that shaggy hair is growing all over his father, who reacts in horror, as he realizes he is turning into Elwood the shaggy dog. He rushes from the house and cameras in his dog form and briefly confounds Tim, who can't understand why his dog Elwood suddenly can speak. The spell wears off, and Wilby is now in his human form again and determined to find the ring as he faces the prospect of being a candidate in the public eye who never knows when he might turn into a dog.

Soon, Wilby's fears come true as Katrinka receives the ring and once again the inscription is read, just as Wilby is giving a public address at a ladies garden club (the Daisies). Betty warns him of his shaggy condition a split-second before his canine form would become apparent to all gathered and creates a near riot while trying to escape. Once again, Tim finds Wilby in Elwood's form and is convinced that his talking dog could make millions; when Tim wanders off momentarily, Wilby returns to his human form, leaving a silent Elwood to confound Tim further. Meanwhile, Raymond, an agent of Wilby's rival, John Slade, gets suspicious and wonders why Wilby keeps disappearing.

Desperate to find the ring, the hunt leads to Katrinka, who seems to have lost it in a vat of cherry pie filling intended for a John Slade fundraiser. Offering a reward to whoever finds the ring, Katrinka and her colleagues go into a mad dash to find it, eventually escalating into a large-scale pie fight. In the pandemonium, the ring once again finds itself in the hands of the local thugs who this time attempt to pass it off to an undercover police detective. Once again in the hands of the museum, the inscription is read aloud as a point of reference; in the middle of the police station, Wilby (who had arrived to confirm the ring had been recovered) finds himself turning into Elwood once again. This time, Slade's agent puts two and two together when he overhears the museum's curator explaining the ring's reputed power and how his predecessor (from the first film) told him a story of a young man that turned into a sheepdog years ago.

Slade is informed of this weakness in his rival, is dubious at first, and then invites Wilby to his office to test out the theory. He advises Wilby to withdraw his campaign. Wilby refuses and tells Slade that when he is elected, he will have him investigated regarding his criminal connections. Slade then reveals he has his ring. With a reading of the inscription, Slade is thrilled to see Wilby Daniels turn into the shaggy dog right before his eyes and makes a call to the local pound. Wilby escapes hearing Slade repeat the inscription several times, which guarantees that the spell will not wear off, and he will be trapped in a dog's form for some time to come. Slade ignores warnings that reciting the incantation too often could cause the spell to transfer to him and keeps reciting the incantation over and over.

Wilby eventually disguises himself as a female roller-derby competitor to elude Slade, who as district attorney has the entire police force and animal control at his disposal. Eventually, Wilby is caught and taken to the local dog pound where he is able to understand the other dogs, who band together to help him escape.

With the help of Brian and Tim (who still thinks his dog Elwood can speak until Wilby tells him the truth about what really happened), Wilby gets evidence that John Slade is connected to organized crime. Wilby and Tim trick Slade into showing up at Roshak's warehouse, and Wilby uses a tape recorder to collect information that confirms Slade's wrongdoings. With the help of his dog friends from the pound, he also manages to retrieve the ring from John Slade, who has read the inscription aloud so many times that the curse has now passed onto him, causing him to transform into a bulldog. Finally, Wilby gets elected district attorney, Slade is stopped by the police for speeding, and is supposedly jailed (although it is never actually revealed), and Tim gets engaged to Katrinka. Together, they adopt Wilby's dog friends from the pound.

Cast
 Dean Jones as Wilby Daniels/The Shaggy dog
 Tim Conway as Tim
 Suzanne Pleshette as Betty Daniels
 Keenan Wynn as John Slade
 Jo Anne Worley as Katrinka Muggelberg
 Dick Van Patten as Raymond
 Shane Sinutko as Brian Daniels
 Vic Tayback as Eddie Roshak
 John Myhers as Admiral Brenner
 Richard Bakalyan as Freddie
 Warren Berlinger as Dip
 John Fiedler as Howie Clemmings
 Hans Conried as Professor Whatley
 Michael McGreevey as Sheldon
 Richard O'Brien as Desk sergeant
 Richard Lane as Roller rink announcer
 Benny Rubin as Waiter
 Ruth Gillette as Song chairman
 Hank Jones as Policeman
 Iris Adrian as Manageress
 Pat McCormick as Bartender
 Henry Slate as Taxi driver
 Milton Frome as Auctioneer
 Walt Davis as TV cameraman
 Albert Able as TV technician
 Mary Ann Gibson, Helene Winston, Joan Crosby as Daisyettes
 Sarah Fankboner as Shopper
 Danny Wells as Police official
 Herb Vigran, Olan Soule as Bar patrons
 Vern Rowe as Dawson
 Karl Lukas as Painter
 John Hayes as Stranger
 Christina Anderson as Lonnie
 George Kirby as "Pound" canine character voices

Background 
The Shaggy Dog had been at that point the most profitable film produced by Walt Disney Productions and heavily influenced the studio's live-action film production for the next two decades. Using a formula of placing supernatural and/or fantastical forces within everyday mid-twentieth century American life, the studio was able to create a long series of "gimmick comedies" (a term coined by Disney historian and film critic Leonard Maltin) with enough action to keep children entertained with a touch of light satire to engage their adult chaperones. Using television actors on their summer hiatus who were familiar to audiences but did not necessarily have enough clout to receive over-the-title billing (or a large fee) from another major studio was one way these comedies were produced inexpensively, they also tended to use the same sets from the Disney backlot repeatedly. This allowed Walt Disney Productions a low-risk scenario for production; any of these films could easily make back their investment just from moderate matinee attendance in neighborhood theatres, and they could also be packaged on the successful Disney anthology television series The Wonderful World of Disney (some of these films were expressly structured for this purpose).

Occasionally, Walt Disney Productions would find one of these inexpensive comedies would become a runaway success and place at or near the top of the box office for their respective release year (The Absent-Minded Professor, The Love Bug). The initial release of The Shaggy Dog in 1959 grossed more than $9 million on a budget of less than $1 million – making it more profitable than Ben-Hur, released the same year. The Shaggy Dog also performed very strongly on a 1967 re-release. The Shaggy D.A. is a sequel to The Shaggy Dog.

Production notes

Cast and crew
Dean Jones and Suzanne Pleshette were frequently paired in other Disney gimmick comedies, such as Blackbeard's Ghost and The Ugly Dachshund. Keenan Wynn had played villainous Alonzo Hawk in many other Disney comedies before taking on the role of John Slade.

This is the last of 19 films Robert Stevenson directed at Disney that spanned nearly 20 years. His first was Johnny Tremain in 1957. He also directed a number of episodes for the series Disneyland. This is also Stevenson's final film. The first film that he directed was Happy Ever After, a 1932 German musical.

Setting
The story was set in fictional Medfield, a town that (along with its eponymous Medfield College) was the setting for six other Disney gimmick comedies, including The Absent-Minded Professor, Son of Flubber, The Million Dollar Duck and the "Dexter Riley" trilogy (The Computer Wore Tennis Shoes, Now You See Him Now You Don’t, and The Strongest Man in the World).

Transformation device
The mythology of the Borgia ring was changed from the first film, in which young Wilby read the inscription on the ring once and then was the victim of random transformations which could only be stopped if he performed a heroic deed. In this sequel, he simply turned into a dog whenever the ring's inscription was read aloud, and the spell would generally last from five to ten minutes.

In the television movie The Return of the Shaggy Dog (1987), which takes place between the events of the original film and this sequel, the mythology changes once again: now, once the inscription is read, Wilby is trapped in dog form until it is read again.

The 2006 remake with Tim Allen eschewed the situation and characters of the three initial films (and also a 1994 television remake which returned the mythology of the original 1959 film) and opted instead for a science fiction device of a man being bitten by a viral dog that infected him with a serum that affected his DNA.

Reception
A. H. Weiler of The New York Times wrote: "Naturally, the story line is incredible and convoluted enough to give an uninhibited cast plenty of opportunities to clown for, unfortunately, a minimum of real laughs ... Despite all the athletic goings-on, The Shaggy D.A. does turn into a dog too often for comfort". Roger Ebert gave the film two-and-a-half stars out of four and called it "one of Disney's better recent efforts". Gene Siskel awarded three stars out of four and declared it "far better than most of the live-action comedies to come out of the studio in recent years. Don Tait actually has written a cute script that gives adults in the audience a few laughs while watching the inevitable and unending pratfalls designed for the kids". Variety wrote that the film "looks like a comparable commercial winner. It has all the elements of smooth and sunny comedy that Disney does best, and it marks a return to top studio craftsmanship after a few uneven pix of late". Charles Champlin of the Los Angeles Times wrote that "The Shaggy D.A. is right off the assembly line, but it is still the most competent line of its kind". Gary Arnold of The Washington Post called the film "a surprisingly snappy and diverting Disney farce". Jill Forbes of The Monthly Film Bulletin called it "dully scripted and poorly paced, and so frequently interrupted by set pieces (the pie fight and Tim's attempt to make his dog talk) that it never succeeds in exploiting a situation which is gratuitous when it is not gruesome".

The film opened at Christmas in 1976 at the same time as the remake of King Kong which slowed its initial performance but the film performed better after the Christmas holidays and earned rentals of $10.5 million in the United States and Canada.

Legacy
The film has been seen as a light satire of American politics in the post-Watergate era, with politicians being depicted as tied to crime, and not being what they appear to be.

A television movie, The Return of the Shaggy Dog, followed in 1987, taking place between The Shaggy Dog and The Shaggy D.A..

The original 1959 film has been remade twice: first, as a television movie in 1994 and as a theatrical feature in 2006.

The 2019 film Mister America depicts The Shaggy D.A. as part of Gregg Turkington's fictional "Victorville Film Archives" project. Mister America also has several notable similarities to The Shaggy D.A., which are commented on by Turkington throughout the film.

References

External links 
 
 
 
 
 

1976 films
1970s fantasy comedy films
American fantasy comedy films
American sequel films
Walt Disney Pictures films
Films about shapeshifting
Films about animal rights
Films about dogs
Films about lawyers
Films directed by Robert Stevenson
Roller derby films
The Shaggy Dog films
Films scored by Buddy Baker (composer)
Color sequels of black-and-white films
1976 comedy films
1970s English-language films
1970s American films